Nicolás Gabriel Albarracín Basil (born 11 June 1993) is an Uruguayan footballer who plays as a right winger for Montevideo Wanderers. He also holds an Italian passport.

Club career
Born in Montevideo, Albarracín graduated from Montevideo Wanderers F.C.'s youth setup. On 21 November 2010, he played his first match as a professional, coming on as a late substitute in a 1–2 home loss against local rivals Club Atlético River Plate for the Uruguayan Primera División championship.

In January 2013, he was sent on a one-year loan to Italian side Spezia Calcio.  He could not play much due to a long injury he suffered and left the club after finishing his contract, staying some months without playing.

International career
Albarracín played various international friendly matches with the Uruguayan U20 team, but was finally desafected from the squad selected for the 2013 South American Youth Championship.

In 2015, he was named to participate in the Uruguay U22 squad for the 2015 Pan American Games.

Honours
Uruguay U-23
Pan American Games: 
Champion : 2015

References

External links

1993 births
Living people
Footballers from Montevideo
Uruguayan people of Italian descent
Uruguayan footballers
Uruguayan expatriate footballers
Association football wingers
Uruguayan Primera División players
Bolivian Primera División players
Argentine Primera División players
Serie B players
Categoría Primera A players
Segunda División players
Liga MX players
Montevideo Wanderers F.C. players
Spezia Calcio players
Peñarol players
Deportivo Cali footballers
CD Lugo players
Atlante F.C. footballers
Querétaro F.C. footballers
Club Plaza Colonia de Deportes players
Club Atlético Patronato footballers
Pan American Games gold medalists for Uruguay
Footballers at the 2015 Pan American Games
Pan American Games medalists in football
Uruguayan expatriate sportspeople in Italy
Uruguayan expatriate sportspeople in Spain
Uruguayan expatriate sportspeople in Colombia
Uruguayan expatriate sportspeople in Mexico
Uruguayan expatriate sportspeople in Argentina
Uruguayan expatriate sportspeople in Bolivia
Expatriate footballers in Italy
Expatriate footballers in Spain
Expatriate footballers in Colombia
Expatriate footballers in Mexico
Expatriate footballers in Argentina
Expatriate footballers in Bolivia
Medalists at the 2015 Pan American Games